Noel Charles O'Brien (9 January 1933 – 15 May 1989) was an Australian rules footballer in the Victorian Football League.

O'Brien made his debut for the Carlton Football Club in the Round 1 of the 1954 season. He sustained a season-ending injury and retired from the game in 1955.

References

External links

 Noel O'Brien at Blueseum

Carlton Football Club players
Echuca Football Club players
Australian rules footballers from Victoria (Australia)
1933 births
1989 deaths